CPFC most often refers to English football club Crystal Palace F.C. It may also refer to:

 Cergy Pontoise FC, also known as CPFC, a French football club
 Crystal Palace Baltimore, also known as CPFC Baltimore, an American soccer club